Kaisupeea is a genus of flowering plants belonging to the family Gesneriaceae.

Its native range is Indo-China. It is found in Myanmar and Thailand.

The genus name of Kaisupeea is in honour of Supee Saksuwan Larsen (b. 1939) and her husband Kai Larsen (1926–2012), a Danish botanist. 
it was first described and published in Nordic J. Bot. Vol.21 on page 116 in 2001.

Known species
According to Kew:
Kaisupeea cyanea 
Kaisupeea herbacea 
Kaisupeea orthocarpa

References

Didymocarpoideae
Gesneriaceae genera
Plants described in 2001
Flora of Myanmar
Flora of Thailand